Christine Jones may refer to:

Christine Jones (artist) (born 1955), Welsh artist
Christine Jones (actress) (born 1943), American soap opera actress
Christine Jones (scenic designer), Broadway scenic designer
Christine M. Jones (1929–2013), member of the Maryland House of Delegates
Christine Jones (businesswoman) (born 1968), American businesswoman and Arizona political candidate
Christine Jones (police officer) (born 1964/1965), British police officer
Christine Jones (bowls) (born 1963), Norfolk Islander lawn bowls player
Christine Jones (Home and Away), a fictional character on the Australian soap opera Home and Away

See also
Christine Jones Forman,  American astrophysicist